Lac Fourchu is a lake in Isère, France.

Fourchu